Matteson is a village in Cook County, Illinois, United States. The population was 19,073 at the 2020 census. It is a suburb of Chicago.

History
The area encompassed by modern Matteson was settled in the late 1800s, primarily by people of German descent. Platted in 1855, Matteson had nearly 500 residents when it incorporated as a village in 1889. The village's namesake is Joel Aldrich Matteson, who served as Illinois' tenth governor from 1853 to 1857. The 20th century saw improvements in plumbing, the electrification of the Illinois Central Railroad, and the construction of today's school district, resulting in significant population growth to more than 3,000 residents by the end of the 1960s. By 2000, Matteson was home to Lincoln Mall (opened 1973) and annexed 195 acres of land for the village. Today, Matteson is home to nearly 20,000 residents, hundreds of businesses, and the close proximity of two major hospitals, Matteson offer the best of suburban living. Matteson features a culturally diverse residential population, a growing business area with a vast amount of shopping centers, award-winning schools, surrounding universities, a state-of-the-art community center, and exceptional Village services.

In 1995 the African-American community became an increasingly large component of Matteson. The village began a program to encourage white people to move to Matteson. By 2011 the community attracted many well to do African-Americans moving from Chicago. Matteson, which experienced increases in the average incomes in households in several census tracts, saw its African-American population increase by 85% and its white population decline by about 1,200 in the time period 2000-2010.

Geography
The village's topography is mostly flat.

Matteson is bordered by Park Forest and Olympia Fields to the east, Country Club Hills and Tinley Park to the north, Frankfort to the west, and Richton Park to the south.

Demographics
As of the 2020 census there were 19,073 people, 7,628 households, and 4,454 families residing in the village. The racial makeup of the village was 82.60% African American, 10.04% White, 0.20% Native American, 0.98% Asian, 0.02% Pacific Islander, 2.29% from other races, and 3.86% from two or more races. Hispanic or Latino of any race were 4.21% of the population.

There were 7,628 households, out of which 41.78% had children under the age of 18 living with them, 41.53% were married couples living together, 14.25% had a female householder with no husband present, and 41.61% were non-families. 38.37% of all households were made up of individuals, and 16.89% had someone living alone who was 65 years of age or older. The average household size was 3.45 and the average family size was 2.52.

The village's age distribution consisted of 21.9% under the age of 18, 9.7% from 18 to 24, 19.5% from 25 to 44, 31.1% from 45 to 64, and 17.8% who were 65 years of age or older. The median age was 44.0 years. For every 100 females, there were 86.3 males. For every 100 females age 18 and over, there were 77.9 males.

The median income for a household in the village was $84,611, and the median income for a family was $111,754. Males had a median income of $62,165 versus $40,552 for females. The per capita income for the village was $38,867. About 7.5% of families and 13.6% of the population were below the poverty line, including 23.5% of those under age 18 and 5.1% of those age 65 or over.

Note: the US Census treats Hispanic/Latino as an ethnic category. This table excludes Latinos from the racial categories and assigns them to a separate category. Hispanics/Latinos can be of any race.

Economy
Matteson was home to Lincoln Mall, which was located at Cicero Avenue and US Highway 30. Once one of the Chicago Southland's major regional shopping centers, Lincoln Mall experienced a protracted decline beginning in the 1990s and closed on January 7, 2015. Demolition of the mall site commenced in May 2017. Several big-box retailers, including Target and JCPenney, are located in close proximity to the former mall, as are hotels and low/midrise office buildings. The Federal Motor Carrier Safety Administration operates its Midwestern Region Service Center in this area.

The  Matteson Auto Mall, just west of Interstate 57 along US Highway 30, is the largest agglomeration of automobile dealerships in Illinois. The Matteson Auto Mall was originally developed by David Miller in 2001. Valspar operates a paint manufacturing facility in Matteson.

Matteson is also the home of Park Place Realty Group LLC, which was recently featured in Black Enterprise Magazine, owned and operated by Calvin & Ro'Shunda Russell.

Government
Matteson is in Illinois's 2nd congressional district.

Matteson's sister city is Pune, India.

Transportation
The Matteson station which opened in 1863, is Matteson’s only train station

 (Lincoln Highway) The village’s major east-west thoroughfare
 The village’s major north-south thoroughfare
 (Cicero Avenue) the village’s second north-south thoroughfare
 (Harlem Avenue) On the western corner of the village.

Education
Matteson is home to three school districts. Elementary School District 159 and Matteson School District 162 serve separate portions of Matteson for grades PK-8. All of Matteson is within the Rich Township High School District 227.

Matteson School District 162
 Arcadia 
 Illinois
 Indiana 
 Matteson 
 Richton Square 
 Sauk 
 O.W. Huth

Elementary School District 159 
 Colin Powell
 Marya Yates 
 Sieden Prairie 
 Woodgate

Rich Township High School, the only public high school operated by the high school district, serves Matteson. Previously Matteson was divided between the attendance boundaries of Rich Central High School and Rich South High School.

Residents of the village may also attend Southland College Preparatory Charter High School.

The Matteson Area Public Library District serves the community. Its current library opened in 1993.

Notable people

 Jon Asamoah, former NFL player, recently played for the Atlanta Falcons during the 2014-2015 season.
 Dreezy, Rapper, lived on and off in Matteson.
 Kendall Gill, former professional basketball player, grew up in Matteson.
 Robin Kelly, Congresswoman for Illinois’ 2nd congressional district, lives in Matteson.
 Sir Michael Rocks, Rapper
 Tyler Ulis, Professional basketball player
 Gerald Walker, Rapper, grew up in Matteson.

References

External links

Village of Matteson official website

Villages in Will County, Illinois
Villages in Illinois
Villages in Cook County, Illinois
Chicago metropolitan area
Populated places established in 1889
1855 establishments in Illinois
Populated places established in 1855
Majority-minority cities and towns in Cook County, Illinois